Chelyadinove (Russian: Челяди́ново, Ukrainian: Челядінове, Crimean Tatar: Töbeçik)  is a village in the district of Lenine Raion in Crimea, Ukraine.

Georgraphy 
Chelyadinove is located in the south-east of the district and the Kerch Peninsula, in an unnamed gully at its confluence from the north into Tobechytske Lake.

References 

Populated coastal places in Ukraine